The Karbis or Mikir are one of the major ethnic communities in Northeast India, mostly concentrated in the hill district of Karbi Anglong of Assam.

Etymology
The origin of the word Karbi is unknown. Historically and by ancestry they called themselves Arleng (literally "man" in Karbi language) and are called Karbi by others.  The term Mikir is now considered derogatory. There is no definitive meaning of the word Mikir in the Karbi language. The closest meaning of Mikir could be said to be derived from "Mekar" (English: People).

Overview 
The Karbi community is the principal indigenous community in the Karbi Anglong district and West Karbi Anglong district of the Indian State of Assam. The districts are administered as per the provisions of the Sixth Schedule of the Constitution of India, having been granted autonomy on 17 November 1951. Besides the Karbi Anglong district, the Karbi-inhabited areas include Dima Hasao, Kamrup Metropolitan, Hojai, Morigaon, Nagaon, Golaghat, Karimganj, Lakhimpur, Sonitpur and Biswanath Chariali districts of Assam; Balijan circle of Papumpare  district in Arunachal Pradesh; Jaintia Hills, Ri Bhoi, East Khasi Hills and West Khasi Hills districts in Meghalaya; Dimapur District in Nagaland, Mizoram and Sylhet district of Bangladesh with disproportionate distribution. However, Karbis in other Indian states like Meghalaya, Mizoram and Nagaland are unable to identify themselves as belonging to the Scheduled Tribes, as the Constitution of India only recognises 'Mikir'. With a population of around 4 lakhs 21 thousand (421,156) as per 2011 Census, the Karbis constitute a large community.

History
The Karbis linguistically belong to the Tibeto-Burman group. The original home of the various people speaking Tibeto-Burman languages was in western China near the Yang-Tee-Kiang and the Howang-ho rivers and from these places, they went down the courses of the Brahmaputra, the Chindwin, and the Irrawaddy and entered India and Burma. The Karbis, along with others, entered North East India from Central Asia or from South East Asian countries like Malaysia, Thailand, Indonesia or the Philippines.

The folklore of the Karbis, however, indicate that during the long past, once they used to live on the banks of the rivers the Kalang and the Kopili, along with Tiwas and Borahis, and the entire Kaziranga area, the famous National Park situated in Assam, was within their habitation. There are also stone monuments, monolithic & megalithic structures laying scattered in various parts of West Karbi Anglong district which forms a part of folklore narratives and are yet to be properly researched. During the reigns of the Dimasa Kachari kings, they were driven to the hills and some of them entered into Jaintia hills, the erstwhile Jaintia Kingdom and lived under Jaintia suzerainty.

While a section of the Karbis remained in the Jaintia kingdom, others moved towards north-east by crossing the river Barapani, a tributary of the Kopili and entered into the Rongkhang Ranges. There they established their capital at a place called Socheng. The Karbis who migrated to the Ahom Kingdom had to face the Burmese invasion.

The Burmese who invaded Assam perpetrated inhumane oppression on the people. The Karbis took refuge in the deep jungles and high hills leaving their hearth and home in the sub-mountainous regions. While some of the Karbis migrated to Western Assam, some had crossed the Brahmaputra and settled in the north bank.

Religion

Most of the Karbis still practices Animism with their cultural and traditional influences.  The practitioners of traditional Animism believe in reincarnation and honour the ancestors, most Karbis follow Hinduism with variations of Vaishnavism. At the base of Karbi religion and belief system, it is basically composed of ritual ancestor worship, worship of household deities & territorial deities and ritual for the dead ancestors or 'Karhi'. Practically, it's the 'Hemphu-Mukrang' duo that dominates the Karbi Pantheon (Teron, 2011). Thus, those Karbis who follow the traditional practices are known as the followers of 'Hemphu-Mukrang' for which they prefer themselves as 'Hemphu-Mukrang aso' meaning Son of Hemphu and Mukrang (Hanse, 2007). The Karbi deities can be divided into three groups according to their function and these are Hem-Angtar, Rongker and Thengpi-Thengso (Phangcho, 2003; Terang, 2007).

In recent years, with the spread of new faiths (Aron Kimi), a number of new religious movements have come to fore, such as Lokhimon (A variation of Vaishnavism founded by Lokhon Ingti Hensek), Karbi Bhaktitom Trust (Founded by Smt. Ambika Tokbipi), Sat Sang (A reform of Hinduism founded by Thakur Anukul Chandra) and Honghari. These religious movements have influenced a section of Karbi population in the district.

Culture and tradition

Language

The Karbis mainly speak their native language, i.e. Karbi language. Karbis are well versed in Assamese which is used as lingua-franca to communicate with other indigenous Assamese communities. Many of the plain Karbis use Assamese as their mother tongue. Several Assamese loan words have made their way into the Karbi Language and this is apparent in most parts of Karbi Anglong. For example, Kaam (Assamese origin word) is used in place of Sai which means Work in English. Even Assamese also has loan words. For example "Hanseronk Tenga" ( Karbi origin word) "Hanseronk". There are also minute variations in native Karbi language that can be observed in different geographical regions inhabited by the Karbis. For example, the Plain Karbis and Hill Karbis.

Clan
The Karbis are a patrilineal society. They are composed of five major clans or Kur. They are Engti (Lijang), Terang (Hanjang), Enghee (Ejang), Teron (Kronjang) and Timung (Tungjang) which are again divided into many sub-clans.

Marriage
Clans in Karbi are exogamous, in other words, marriages between members of the same clan are not allowed because they are considered brothers and sisters among themselves. Cousin Marriage (in-laws, Mother & Father side) is highly favoured and so is a love marriage. Arranged marriages are rarely seen in modern Karbi society. After marriage, neither the bride nor the groom changes their surname i.e. they retain their original surname. Due to the same reason, a member of the same clan cannot marry each other. The children of the couple would inherit the surname of their father. The notion of Dowry doesn't exist in Karbi, as well as in the indigenous people of Northeast India region.

Governance
The traditional system of governance is headed by the Lindok, the king, who is assisted by the Katharpo, the Dilis, the Habes, and the Pinpos. These posts of administration, however, are now merely ceremonial with no real power.

Festivals
The Karbis celebrate many festivals. Among them Hacha-Kekan, Chojun, Rongker, Peng Karkli, Thoi Asor Rit Asor and Botor Kekur are some such festivals held around the year and some of them are held at a specific time of the year. Botor Kekur is celebrated to request God to grace the earth with rain so that the crops could be sown. Rongker is celebrated either on 5 January or on 5 February as per the convenience of the villagers as a thanksgiving to God and asking for their assurance to protect them from any evil harm that may happen to the village and the people living in it.

Death
The Chomangkan (also known as "thi-karhi") is a festival unique to the Karbis. It is a ceremony performed by a family for the peace and safe passage of the soul of a deceased family member, who died recently or long ago. This is the final homage for the deceased person and no further death anniversary is celebrated/held again.

Clothing and Ornaments

Karbis have their own traditional attire. Their clothing is very similar to South East Asian clothing, but with varied materials and design.

The traditional attire of women consists of Pini, Pekok, Vamkok and Jiso. Pini is a type of skirt of black colour and worn around the waist tied with a belt. It can be of different designs like jangre, santok, honki ranchom, marbong homkri, ahi cherop, chamburukso apini, mekserek etc. Pekok is a square piece of cloth tied at the right shoulder. It can be of different colours and designs like pe sleng, pe duphirso, pe khonjari, pe luru, pe jangphong and pe sarpi. Pe sarpi is generally for older women, pe sleng, pe jangphong is for middle-aged women while pe duphirso is meant for young women. Vamkok is a belt used to tie the Pini tight at the waist. It has colourful fringes at both the length ends and can be found in designs like amekpi, amekso, abermung, thoithesuri angphar, suve arvo and phonglong angsu etc. Jiso is a long black cloth with designs and decorated fringes at the length end worn to cover the breasts. Nowadays it has been replaced by the blouse.

The attire of men includes Choi, Poho, Rikong and Sator. Choi is the jacket worn by men. These are of different types like choi hongthor, choi ik, choi ang, choi miri etc. Choi hongthor a ki-ik, choi hongthor ake-lok are meant for young men. While choi ang, choi miri are for middle aged and aged men. Poho is worn around the head or used as a muffler. The different kinds of poho include the simple long white poho, poho ke-er, and poho kelok. Rikong is the loin cloth worn by men during work, but it is rarely used now. It is of various types like rikong jongjong with colourful designs and simple white rikong bamon. Sator is a white piece of cloth worn by men around the waist as the dhoti covering the whole length of the legs. A long pe seleng is also used as sator with colourful designs all over and borders at both the length end which covers up to the knee.

In the case of ornaments, the Karbi society has certain rules. Karbi women are usually not allowed to wear gold ornaments, which are reserved for men. Since women wear more ornaments than men, silver is abundantly used. A distinct piece of ornament that Karbi women wear around their necks in silver is Lek. Leks are made of coins and colourful beads too and are locally known by the name of Ser Alek Pongting, Lek Pengkhara, Lek Bonghom, Lek Waikom, Lek Jingjiri, etc. Men too wear Leks – in gold. The traditional names of lek that men wear are Lek Ruve, Lek Sobai and Lek Manduli. Many of these ornaments are unfortunately no longer commonly found. Like women in any other community, Karbi women too wear bracelets, called Roi. A variety of Rois are in use such as Roi Pengkhara, Roi Ke-er, Roi Kelok, etc. The ornaments that women wear to adorn their ears are called No Thengpi. Again, there are different types of No Thengpis, such as Thengpi Angrongkatengbai, Angrong Kangchim, etc. Men of the tribe too wear ear ornaments. They are called Norik, made of gold or silver. The rings that Karbis wear are called Arnan. Arnan Ke-et, Arnan Kelop, Rup Bonda, Ser Bonda and Vokapardon Arnan are some of the rings that Karbis commonly flaunt on their fingers. Interestingly, Karbi priests wear arnans only made of copper.

Traditionally, a characteristic feature of a Karbi woman was her facial tattoo, dyed with indigo from the forehead down to the chin. Locally referred as 'duk' in Karbi dialect, the tattoo was a symbol of culture, purity and status in the society. It was believed that duk was not a mere tattoo but possessed the divinity to purify the soul; girls who had not received duk were considered immature and unholy.

Music and musical instruments

Karbi have a rich oral tradition with songs, which are different from normal spoken words. These songs are an oral narration of ancestors' stories passed through generations. Karbi history has been carried forward through narrative songs. Thanks to Rangsina Sarpo, the first mentor of music, art and culture of the Karbis, who was believed to have enlightened them and brought a renaissance in the domain of art and aesthetics by acting like a sauntering folk singer assisted by the Mirjeng brothers. Karbi musical instruments are similar to other indigenous tribal musical instruments. The difference is in the variance of play and beat.

Economy
The Karbis residing in hilly areas traditionally practice jhum cultivation (Slash-and-burn cultivation) whereas those dwelling in the plains earn their livelihood by engaging in agriculture and livestock rearing. They grow a variety of crops which include foodgrains, vegetables and fruits like rice, maize, potato, sweet potato, tapioca, beans, ginger, and turmeric. They are quite self-sufficient and have homestead gardens with betel nut, jackfruit, oranges, pineapple, pear, peach, plum, etc. which fulfill their nutritional as well as food needs. However, with the integration of the traditional lifestyle with the market economy, many of the traditional institutions and way of life has been left damaged, bringing about unending sufferings on the people.

Karbi people have the highest HPI (Human Poverty Index) value of 33.52, indicating that this tribe has the highest number of people in human poverty. (Assam Human Development Report, 2003).

See also
 Karbi language
 Karbi Youth Festival
 Karen people

References

External links
   Karbi Anglong District information
  More information on Karbis of Assam
 Ethnography of Karbis
 Ethnologue profile, old profile 
 MEETING THE THREAT OF CONVERSION: The Emerging Healthy Trends
 Indian Catholic, Christian leaders gather warring ethnic groups for peace
 The Mikirs, a cultural treatise by Edward Stack, Indian Civil Service, 1908, at Project Gutenberg

Social groups of Assam
Tribes of Assam
Karbi Anglong district
Tribes of Arunachal Pradesh
Sino-Tibetan-speaking people
Scheduled Tribes of Meghalaya
Scheduled Tribes of Assam
Scheduled Tribes of Arunachal Pradesh
Scheduled Tribes of Nagaland
Ethnic groups in Northeast India
Ethnic groups in South Asia